Eres mi tesoro (English: You Are My Treasure) is a Chilean telenovela created by Yusef Rufie, that premiered on Mega on July 29, 2015 and ended on April 6, 2016. It stars María José Bello, Álvaro Morales and Felipe Contreras.

Cast 
 María José Bello as Julieta Lizama
 Álvaro Morales as Álvaro Cummings
 Felipe Contreras as Juan Riquelme
 Viviana Rodríguez as Carolina Ruiz
 César Caillet as Rodrigo Pezoa
 Teresita Reyes as Delia Contreras
 Loreto Valenzuela as Gabriela Aldunate
 Dayana Amigo as Susana "Susy" Pizarro
 Edgardo Bruna as Ángel Riquelme
 Celine Reymond as Bernardita Cummings
 Pedro Vicuña as Jorge "El Tigre" Pizarro
 Etienne Bobenrieth as Ricardo "Richi" Pizarro
 Constanza Araya as Marión Lizama
 Ricardo Vergara as Benjamín Cummings Ruiz
 Félix Villar as "El Flash"
 Isidora Guzmán as Alma Lizama
 Teresa Münchmeyer as Rodrigo's mother
 Max Meriño as Carolina's doctor
 Luz María Yacometti as Beatriz, Carolina's nurse

Ratings

References

External links 
 

2015 telenovelas
Chilean telenovelas
Mega (Chilean TV channel) telenovelas
2015 Chilean television series debuts
2016 Chilean television series endings
Spanish-language telenovelas